Béni Mellal-Khénifra is one of the twelve regions of Morocco. It covers an area of 28,374 km2 and recorded a population of 2,520,776 in the 2014 Moroccan census. The capital of the region is Beni Mellal.

Geography
Béni Mellal-Khénifra is located in the interior of the country. It borders Rabat-Salé-Kénitra to the north, Fès-Meknès to the northeast, Drâa-Tafilalet to the southeast, Marrakesh-Safi to the southwest and Casablanca-Settat to the northwest. In the western and central part of the region is the productive Tadla plain irrigated by the Oum Er-Rbia River. This plain is bracketed by the High Atlas mountains which run through the southern and eastern parts of the region, and the foothills of the Middle Atlas to the north.

History

Béni Mellal-Khénifra was formed in September 2015 by adding Khouribga Province of Chaouia-Ouardigha region and Khénifra Province of Meknès-Tafilalet region to the three provinces previously making up the region of Tadla-Azilal.

Government

Ibrahim Moujahid, a member of the Authenticity and Modernity Party, was elected as the regional council's first president on 14 September 2015. Mohamed Derdouri was appointed governor (wali) of the region on 13 October 2015.

Subdivisions

Béni Mellal-Khénifra comprises five provinces:
 Azilal Province
 Béni Mellal Province
 Fquih Ben Salah Province
 Khénifra Province
 Khouribga Province

Economy
Agriculture is the backbone of the region's economy. Major crops include cereals, beetroot, olives, citrus fruits and pomegranates; the production of milk and meat is also substantial. The Ouled Abdoun Basin near Khouribga holds 44% of Morocco's phosphate reserves.

Infrastructure
The Berrechid–Beni Mellal expressway connects the region with the rest of the national expressway network, passing through the cities of Beni Mellal, Oued Zem and Khouribga as it heads northwest to Berrechid just south of Casablanca. National Route 8 is another important highway, connecting Beni Mellal and Khenifra with Marrakesh in the southeast and Fez in the northwest. Beni Mellal Airport is served by Royal Air Maroc, and there is a rail line with passenger service that runs between Oued Zem, Khouribga and Casablanca.

References

External links